JNG may refer to:

 JPEG Network Graphics
 JNG-90, sniper rifle
 Jets'n'Guns
 ISO 639 code for Wardaman language
 IATA code for Jining Qufu Airport
 Station code for Jatinegara railway station
 John Nance Garner (1868–1967), 32nd vice president of the United States